Heroes of the Street is a 1922 American silent crime drama film directed by William Beaudine.
It stars child actor Wesley Barry, Marie Prevost, and Jack Mulhall. This film survives in George Eastman House.

Plot
When a smart aleck street kid's father, a policeman, is killed in the line of duty, the boy turns over a new leaf and goes to work to support his mother, brothers and sisters. He gets a job as an usher in a theater, but really wants to become a policeman to avenge the death of his father. He soon finds himself involved in a fake kidnapping, real gangsters and a tip on the identity of the man who killed his dad.

Cast
Wesley Barry as Mickey Callahan
Marie Prevost as Betty Benton
Jack Mulhall as Howard Lane
Philo McCullough as Shadow
Will Walling as Officer Mike Callahan
Aggie Herring as Mrs. Callahan
Wilfred Lucas 			
Wedgwood Nowell 			
Philip Ford 	
Peaches Jackson 			
William Beaudine Jr. 
Joe Butterworth 		
Cameo the Dog as Dog

Box office
According to Warner Bros records, the film earned $366,000 domestically and $30,000 foreign.

References

External links
 

1922 films
1922 crime drama films
American silent feature films
American black-and-white films
Films directed by William Beaudine
American crime drama films
Films produced by Harry Rapf
1920s American films
Silent American drama films